Adams Township may refer to:

Illinois
 Adams Township, La Salle County, Illinois

Indiana
 Adams Township, Allen County, Indiana
 Adams Township, Carroll County, Indiana
 Adams Township, Cass County, Indiana
 Adams Township, Decatur County, Indiana
 Adams Township, Hamilton County, Indiana
 Adams Township, Madison County, Indiana
 Adams Township, Morgan County, Indiana
 Adams Township, Parke County, Indiana
 Adams Township, Ripley County, Indiana
 Adams Township, Warren County, Indiana

Iowa

 Adams Township, Dallas County, Iowa
 Adams Township, Delaware County, Iowa
 Adams Township, Keokuk County, Iowa
 Adams Township, Mahaska County, Iowa
 Adams Township, Wapello County, Iowa

Kansas
 Adams Township, Nemaha County, Kansas

Michigan
 Adams Township, Arenac County, Michigan
 Adams Township, Hillsdale County, Michigan
 Adams Township, Houghton County, Michigan

Minnesota
 Adams Township, Mower County, Minnesota

Missouri
 Adams Township, DeKalb County, Missouri
 Adams Township, Harrison County, Missouri

Nebraska
 Adams Township, Nebraska

North Dakota
 Adams Township, North Dakota

Ohio
 Adams Township, Champaign County, Ohio
 Adams Township, Clinton County, Ohio
 Adams Township, Coshocton County, Ohio
 Adams Township, Darke County, Ohio
 Adams Township, Defiance County, Ohio
 Adams Township, Guernsey County, Ohio
 Adams Township, Lucas County, Ohio, defunct, incorporated into the city of Toledo 
 Adams Township, Monroe County, Ohio
 Adams Township, Muskingum County, Ohio
 Adams Township, Seneca County, Ohio
 Adams Township, Washington County, Ohio

Oklahoma
 Adams Township, Harper County, Oklahoma

Pennsylvania
 Adams Township, Butler County, Pennsylvania
 Adams Township, Cambria County, Pennsylvania
 Adams Township, Snyder County, Pennsylvania

South Dakota
 Adams Township, Grant County, South Dakota
 Adams Township, Miner County, South Dakota

See also
 Adams (disambiguation)

Township name disambiguation pages